Bruno Trentin (9 December 1926 – 23 August 2007) was an Italian trade unionist and politician, General Secretary of Italian General Confederation of Labour from 1988 to 1994.

Biography 
Trentin was born in Pavie, France, where his parents lived after escaping from the Fascist regime. After the Armistice of Cassibile, the Trentin family came back to Italy and joined the Italian resistance movement: at the age of 17, Trentin became the leader of the "Justice and Freedom" Brigade.

In 1949, Trentin graduated in Law at the University of Padua, adhering to the Proudhonian thoughts, and joined both the Italian General Confederation of Labour and the Italian Communist Party, with which he was elected to the city council of Rome and to the Chamber of Deputies.

In 1988, Trentin became Secretary-general of the CGIL: in 1992, together with the leaders of the Italian Confederation of Workers' Trade Unions and the Italian Labour Union, Trentin signed a deal that put an end to the sliding wage scale system.

From 1999 to 2004, Trentin has been a member of the European Parliament, elected with the Democrats of the Left.

Trentin died in Rome on 23 August 2007, at the age of 80, of pneumonia. He is now buried in the Verano Cemetery.

References

External links 
Files about his parliamentary activities (in Italian): IV legislature

1926 births
2007 deaths
Italian Communist Party politicians
Italian trade unionists
20th-century Italian politicians
21st-century Italian politicians
Italian resistance movement members
Deaths from pneumonia in Lazio